Herman Albrecht VC (1876 – 6 January 1900) was a Cape Colony recipient of the Victoria Cross, the highest and most prestigious award for gallantry in the face of the enemy that can be awarded to British and Commonwealth forces.

Details 
Albrecht was about 24 years old, and a Trooper in the Imperial Light Horse (Natal), South African Forces during the Second Boer War when the following deed took place for which he was awarded the Victoria Cross.

On 6 January 1900 during the attack on Wagon Hill, near Ladysmith, South Africa, Lieutenant Robert James Thomas Digby-Jones of the Royal Engineers and Trooper Albrecht led the force which re-occupied the top of the hill at a critical moment, just as the three foremost attacking Boers reached it. The leader was shot by the lieutenant and the two others by Trooper Albrecht. He was jointed cited with Lt Digby-Jones:

The Medal

His Victoria Cross is displayed at the National Museum of Military History in Johannesburg.

See also
The Register of the Victoria Cross
List of Second Boer War Victoria Cross recipients

Notes

References

External links 
Photos of the battlefield at Wagon Hill
Burial location of Herman Albrecht Natal, South Africa
Location of Herman Albrecht's Victoria Cross South Africa Museum of Military History, Johannesburg
Details of the action

1876 births
1900 deaths
People from Burgersdorp
British colonial army soldiers
Second Boer War recipients of the Victoria Cross
Cape Colony recipients of the Victoria Cross
British military personnel killed in the Second Boer War